Better Than the Rest is the third album (mini-album) of songs by George Thorogood and the Destroyers, recorded in 1974 and released in 1979. When the songs were recorded, Thorogood was an unknown artist who was not signed to a record label. After he had released his first two official albums on Rounder Records in 1977 and 1978, Better Than The Rest was released by MCA. In 1986, the songs from this album were released on compact disc with the title Nadine, in a different track order.

Track listing
 "In the Night Time" (Michael Henderson, Sylvester Rivers) – 3:08
 "I'm Ready" (Willie Dixon) – 2:46
 "Goodbye Baby" (Joe Josea, Jules Taub, Sam Ling) – 3:08
 "Howlin for My Darling" (Dixon, Howlin' Wolf) – 3:24
 "My Weakness" (Vetter Smith, Wilson) – 2:26
 "Nadine" (Chuck Berry) – 4:03
 "My Way" (Eddie Cochran, Jerry Capehart) – 1:56
 "You're Gonna Miss Me" (Eddie Jones) – 2:14
 "Worried About My Baby" (Wolf) – 3:29
 "Huckle Up Baby" (Bernard Besman, John Lee Hooker) – 2:24

Personnel

Musicians
George Thorogood – guitar, vocals
Michael Levine – bass
Jeff Simon – drums, vocals

Technical
Danny Lipman – producer
Joe Chicarrelli – engineer

Charts

1979 albums
George Thorogood and the Destroyers albums
MCA Records albums